John Lincoln Williams (born 12 May 1961) is a Welsh writer who has published as John Williams, John L. Williams, and John Lincoln.

Early life 
Williams was born in Cardiff, where he currently lives, and grew up in a middle-class neighbourhood. In his teens, he joined the punk scene and moved to Camden Town to live in a squat and play in bands. After discovering the works of Elmore Leonard he began writing book reviews for NME and The Sunday Times.

Career 
In 1994, Williams published Into the Badlands (1991), a combination of travelogue and interviews with American crime fiction authors, including Elmore Leonard, James Ellroy, Carl Hiaasen, and Sara Paretsky. This was followed in 1994 by Bloody Valentine, a nonfiction account of the killing of sex worker Lynette White in the inner-city district of Butetown.

Five Pubs, Two Bars and a Nightclub (1999), a collection of short stories, was his fiction debut. It became the first volume in the so-called 'Cardiff Trilogy', which includes the novels Cardiff Dead (2000) and The Prince of Wales (2003). He has also written biographies of the singer and Butetown native Dame Shirley Bassey and the Trinidadian Black Power activist Michael X and the Trinidadian historian and writer C.L.R. James.

He writes crime fiction under the name "John Lincoln", 

Williams currently writes for The Mail on Sunday and The Independent and is co-organiser of the Laugharne Festival.

Selected works

Non-fiction 

 Into the Badlands (Paladin, 1991)
 Bloody Valentine (HarperCollins, 1994)
 Michael X: a Life in Black and White (Century, 2008)
 Miss Shirley Bassey (Quercus, 2010)
 Bloody Valentine (Updated Edition) (Oldcastle Books, 2021)
 C.L.R. James: A Life Beyond the Boundaries (Constable, 2022).

Fiction 

 Five Pubs, Two Bars and a Nightclub (Bloomsbury, 1999)
 Cardiff Dead (Bloomsbury, 2000)
 The Prince of Wales (Bloomsbury 2003)
 Temperance Town (Bloomsbury, 2004)
 The Cardiff Trilogy (Bloomsbury, 2006) (an omnibus volume collecting Five Pubs, Two Bars and a Nightclub; Cardiff Dead; and The Prince of Wales)
 Fade to Grey (No Exit Press, 2019) (under "John Lincoln")

References 

1961 births
20th-century British male writers
20th-century British non-fiction writers
20th-century Welsh writers
21st-century British male writers
21st-century British non-fiction writers
21st-century British short story writers
21st-century Welsh novelists
British male non-fiction writers
British male short story writers
Journalists from Cardiff
Living people
Welsh crime novelists
Welsh male novelists
Welsh short story writers
Writers from Cardiff